The Afro-Asian Cup of Nations, also called the AFC Asia/Africa Challenge Cup, was an intercontinental football competition endorsed by the Confederation of African Football (CAF) and the Asian Football Confederation (AFC), contested between representative nations from these confederations, usually the winners of the Africa Cup of Nations and the winners of the AFC Asian Cup or the Asian Games. All editions were official competitions of CAF and AFC and indirectly also of FIFA. For FIFA statute, official competitions are those for representative teams organized by FIFA or any confederation.
The most successful team is Japan with 2 championships.

History
The first edition in 1978, where Iran defeated Ghana 3-0, the trophy was not awarded: because the second leg was cancelled due to political problems in Iran. The 1989, 2005 editions were cancelled. The 1997 edition was severely delayed to 1999, while the "true" 1999 edition (between Egypt and Iran) was also canceled.

The competition was discontinued following a CAF decision on July 30, 2000, after AFC representatives had supported Germany rather than South Africa in the vote for hosting the 2006 World Cup. The competition was scheduled to be resumed in 2005 with the match Tunisia-Japan, but then was cancelled. However the trophy was resumed in 2007 under the name "AFC Asia/Africa Challenge Cup". The 2008 edition was scheduled to be played in November 2008 between Iraq and Egypt in the neutral venue of Saudi Arabia but was eventually cancelled.

Results and statistics

Finals

Most successful national teams

Results by confederation

See also 
 AFC–OFC Challenge Cup
 Afro-Asian Club Championship
 CONMEBOL–UEFA Cup of Champions
 Panamerican Championship

Notes

References

External links 
 Afro-Asian Cup of Nations at the RSSSF
 Coupe Afro-asiatique des nation at Football-the-story.com 

 
Asian Football Confederation competitions for national teams
Confederation of African Football competitions for national teams
Recurring sporting events established in 1978